This is a list of public art in the city of Aarhus, in the Central Denmark Region, Denmark. This list applies only to works of public art accessible in an outdoor public space. For example, this does not include artwork visible inside a museum.

Aarhus

Midtbyen

Frederiksbjerg

Vesterbro

Indre by

Trøjborg

Nørre Stenbro

Viby

Højbjerg

References 

Aarhus
Aarhus